Hobbes is primarily used to refer to:

Thomas Hobbes (1588–1679), English philosopher and creator of the social contract theory

Hobbes may also refer to:

People
 Fredric Hobbs (1931–2018), American experimental filmmaker
 Halliwell Hobbes (1877–1962), actor
 John Oliver Hobbes (1867–1906), pen-name of Pearl Mary Teresa Craigie
 Roger Hobbes, English politician

Characters
 Hobbes (Calvin and Hobbes), a tiger from the comic strip Calvin and Hobbes
 Hobbes, a character in the Fables comic book series
 Miranda Hobbes, a character on Sex and the City
 Ralgha nar Hhallas, known as "Hobbes", a character in the computer game series Wing Commander

See also 

 
 Hob (disambiguation)
 Hobb (disambiguation)
 Hobbe (disambiguation)
 Hobbs (disambiguation)
 Hobbie (disambiguation)
 Hobby (disambiguation)
 Hobbism